Liptena ferrymani, the Ferryman's liptena, is a butterfly in the family Lycaenidae. It is found in Guinea-Bissau, Guinea, Ivory Coast, Nigeria, Cameroon and Sudan. The habitat consists of savanna, drier forests and gallery forests.

Subspecies
 Liptena ferrymani ferrymani (Nigeria, northern Cameroon, southern Sudan)
 Liptena ferrymani bigoti Stempffer, 1964 (Guinea, northern Ivory Coast)
 Liptena ferrymani bissau Collins & Larsen, 2003 (Guinea-Bissau, Guinea)

References

Butterflies described in 1891
Liptena
Butterflies of Africa